Reuben Elishama Hadju Soerjosoemarno (born 18 September 1978) is an actor and singer from the band Channel.

Biography 
The son of a senior artist Marini and Didi Hadju initially had chosen profession as an office worker. But the younger brother of singer  is not able to deny his passion for singing. He later founded the band Channel.

Nia Dinata's bids to co-star in Arisan! (2003) was rejected by Reuben. Similarly, when offered to join again in Berbagi Suami. Through this film anyway, Reuben got the Best Male Supporting Actor Nominated Film Festival Indonesia 2006. Reuben then played in the movie Kangen (2007) as the main character with Bunga Citra Lestari.

On 14 May 2006, ahead of the Parfi's Congress to be held on 18–19 May 2006, congress organizers try to attract the sympathy of the young artist, by giving awards to young artists who come on the show Parfi Film Exposé & Parfi Award, held at the Hardrock Cafe. Reuben is one of the artists who received awards. In addition to Reuben, also participated in Tora Sudiro, Sauzan, Laudya Chintya Bella, Winky Wiryawan, Pretty Asmara, Fauzi Baadilla, Indra Bekti, Adinia Wirasti, Ivan, Marcella Zalianti, Nicholas Saputra, and Dennis Adhiswara.

Reuben (vocals) with Alfa (guitar), Mario (guitar), and Buggi (drums) formed the band Channel (band) in mid-2003 and had a hit soared through the "Tentang Kita" on their debut album Perjalanan Dua Insan (2006). So that Mario (guitar) and Buggi (drums) declared out and create his own band. So Reuben stayed with Alfa accompanied by two additional players who will soon release a second album.

Filmography 
 Arisan! (2003) 
 Berbagi Suami (2006)
 Kangen (2007)
 Takut: Faces of Fear (2008) – Segmen The Rescue
 Sanubari Jakarta (2012)

Discography 
 Perjalanan Dua Insan (2006) with the band Channel

References 

1978 births
Indonesian male actors
21st-century Indonesian male singers
People from Jakarta
Indonesian people of Dutch descent
Indonesian people of Dutch-Jewish descent
Indo people
Living people